The Bridgeport Bluefish were an American minor league baseball team based in Bridgeport, Connecticut. The team was a member of the Liberty Division of the Atlantic League of Professional Baseball, which was not affiliated with Major League Baseball. They played their home games at The Ballpark at Harbor Yard from 1998 to 2017.

The franchise had announced it would relocate to High Point, North Carolina, in 2019, but ceased operations instead. In its place, a new franchise not connected to the Bluefish began play in High Point called the High Point Rockers.

History of Bridgeport baseball
The game of baseball was first played in Bridgeport, Connecticut soon after the Civil War ended.  Teams that called the city home included the Victors, Soubrettes, Orators, Crossmen, Mechanics, Hustlers, Bolts, Americans, Bees, and Bears. Bridgeport was the home of Major Leaguer James "Orator" O'Rourke, who signed the first African-American to play for a professional baseball team in 1895.

Visiting Major League and Negro league teams often played exhibition games in the shadow of the Bridgeport's smokestacks. The last affiliated minor league baseball team, the Bridgeport Bees, played in the Interstate League and the Colonial League from 1941 to 1950. Professional baseball was not played in Bridgeport for about another half-century, until the arrival of the Bluefish in 1998.

Bridgeport Bluefish
The first game of the Bridgeport Bluefish was May 21, 1998. The team has been to five Atlantic League Championship Series. It won in 1999 against the Somerset Patriots and lost to Atlantic City in 1998, Newark in 2002, Lancaster in 2006, and York in 2010.

Some of the former major leaguers who have worn Bluefish jerseys include Endy Chávez, Shea Hillenbrand, Alex Hinshaw, José Offerman, Edgardo Alfonzo, Deivi Cruz, Junior Spivey, Quinton McCracken, Antonio Alfonseca, Willy Mo Pena, Joey Gathright, Adam Greenberg, and Mariano Duncan.

The Bluefish won their first league championship in 1999, led by their inaugural manager, and long time major leaguer – Willie Upshaw. The Bluefish have won the most games in Atlantic League history. The land under The Ballpark at Harbor Yard was purchased by the city of Bridgeport from Donald Trump for $1 and with the forgiveness of back taxes owed on the property. The Jenkins Valve plant was demolished to make way for the stadium. The success of the Bluefish led to redevelopment of the South End, including construction of the Arena at Harbor Yard and a multiuse parking garage.

The founders of the Bluefish were Mickey Herbert, Jack McGregor, Mary–Jane Foster, and the Bridgeport Waterfront Investors. Herbert anchored the team through a mayoral scandal and difficult financial circumstances. Prior to the 2006 season, the franchise was purchased by Get Hooked, LLC, a group of investors from Fairfield County that included McGregor and Foster.  However, Get Hooked dropped the Bluefish prior to the 2008 season in favor of seeking a new ballpark for the city of Yonkers, New York.  The Bluefish were purchased by Frank Boulton, who is also the owner of the Long Island Ducks and the founder of the Atlantic League.

The Bluefish became the first team in Atlantic League history to record 1,000 victories as a franchise in 2012. On June 27, 2012, the team defeated the York Revolution 2–1 at the Ballpark at Harbor Yard to capture the victory.

For one day in May 2016, Jennie Finch was a guest manager for the Bluefish, thus becoming the first woman to manage a professional baseball team. The team played and won one game that day.

In April 2017, the City of High Point, North Carolina, approved $15 million from the city budget to begin land acquisition and engineering studies for a new $45 million, publicly funded stadium to be financed through limited-obligation tax bonds. The stadium was expected to be the new home for the Bluefish in 2019. It had yet to be determined where (or if) the Bluefish would play in 2018.

On August 8, 2017, the Bluefish announced that the 2017 season would be the team's last in Bridgeport. On September 17, the Bluefish played the final game in their 20-year history at the Ballpark at Harbor Yard, losing 9–2 to the Somerset Patriots. Despite having the best overall record in the Liberty Division, the Bluefish missed the playoffs, as they finished one game back of the Patriots in the first–half standings and two games back of their cross-sound rival Long Island Ducks in the second half.

Though it had been planned for the Bluefish to relocate to High Point, later the team ceased operations at the end of the 2017 season. High Point got an expansion franchise that is not connected to the Bluefish (the High Point Rockers).

The Ballpark at Harbor Yard was converted to a concert venue known as Hartford HealthCare Amphitheater. A groundbreaking ceremony for the replacement amphitheater was held in July 2018. The amphitheater opened July 28, 2021.

Logos and uniforms
The official colors of the Bridgeport Bluefish were navy blue, teal, and silver. The primary logo consisted of the "Bluefish" wordmark in navy blue with white and teal outline superimposed over a depiction of a cartoon bluefish holding a baseball bat.

The primary cap was navy blue with a teal brim and button, with the cap logo depicting a bluefish interwoven with a capital "B" centered on the front. The home jersey was white with traditional navy blue piping below the collar and around the sleeves. The "Bluefish" wordmark is centered across the front in navy blue with white outline and teal drop shadow. The away jersey is grey with navy blue piping, and the "Bridgeport" wordmark centered across the front in navy blue with a white and teal outline.  The Bluefish also have a teal alternate jersey, with navy piping with the "fishhook" wordmark centered across the front.

Season-by-season records

 1 Atlantic League Championship (1999)
 5 Division Championships (1998, 1999, 2002, 2006, 2010)

Ferry Cup
The Bridgeport Bluefish contend with the Long Island Ducks over the Ferry Cup, which is sponsored by the Bridgeport & Port Jefferson Steamboat Company.  The two teams border on Long Island Sound, and many fans of both teams regularly cross it to support them. The Ducks currently hold the Ferry Cup by winning the 2011 season series 12–6. As of 2011 the Bluefish-Ducks rivalry record is 114–112, in favor of Bridgeport.

Mascots
One of the Bridgeport Bluefish official mascots is an anthropomorphic bluefish named B.B.  He wears the team's alternate jersey (number 98) with black sneakers.  B.B. was born on May 29, 1997, in Cape Hatteras.  He later migrated to the Long Island Sound and joined the Bluefish soon after.  The mascot's name alludes to the initials of the team and its nickname.

Captain L.I Sounder is another source of entertainment at the Harbor Yard.  He wears a uniform of a sailor. L.I Sounder's name referred to the nautical rank of captain and a name for a Long Island Sound resident. Sounder occasionally appears at Bluefish home games.

Retired numbers 

 42 (Jackie Robinson) 2B, Retired throughout professional baseball on April 15, 1997

 21 (Roberto Clemente) RF, Retired by the Bluefish in 2006

 19 (Luis Lopez) 3B, Retired by the Bluefish on September 19, 2015,

1 (Angel Espada)

Guest managers
On several occasions, the Bluefish had promotional nights in which former baseball players and managers, as well as other celebrities, have been enlisted to serve as guest managers.

See also 
 Professional baseball in Connecticut

References

External links 

 
Sports in Bridgeport, Connecticut
Tourist attractions in Fairfield County, Connecticut
Professional baseball teams in Connecticut
Defunct Atlantic League of Professional Baseball teams
1997 establishments in Connecticut
Baseball teams established in 1997
2017 disestablishments in Connecticut
Baseball teams disestablished in 2017
Defunct baseball teams in Connecticut